Helder Cossa (born 26 September 1969) is a Mozambican footballer. He played in two matches for the Mozambique national football team from 1998 to 2002. He was also named in Mozambique's squad for the 1998 African Cup of Nations tournament.

References

External links
 

1969 births
Living people
Mozambican footballers
Mozambique international footballers
1998 African Cup of Nations players
Place of birth missing (living people)
Association football goalkeepers
C.D. Maxaquene players